Same-sex marriage in New Brunswick has been legal since June 23, 2005 in accordance with a ruling from the Court of Queen's Bench of New Brunswick. This decision followed similar cases in eight other provinces and territories, and pre-dated by only one month the federal Civil Marriage Act of 2005, which legalised same-sex marriage throughout Canada. New Brunswick became the ninth jurisdiction in Canada to recognise same-sex marriage, and the twelfth worldwide.

Background
Following a number of court rulings in other provinces and territories recognizing the right of same-sex couples to marry, Attorney General Brad Green announced in September 2004 that New Brunswick would not follow in the footsteps of Nova Scotia in issuing marriage licences to same-sex couples. He argued that the definition is a federal matter, and the province would recognize only marriages between a man and a woman until the Government of Canada comes up with another definition (as it finally did with the Civil Marriage Act in 2005). In December 2004, Premier Bernard Lord indicated that if and when the federal government passes such legislation, his government would comply with it. He also indicated he would comply with a court ruling, even though he was personally opposed to same-sex marriage, and promised to push for the passage of a provincial law protecting religious groups from being sued if they refuse to marry same-sex couples. The leader of the New Brunswick New Democratic Party, Elizabeth Weir, welcomed the Supreme Court's findings in Reference Re Same-Sex Marriage.

Court ruling
In April 2005, four same-sex couples filed a court challenge, Harrison v. AG of Canada, against the government's policy of denying marriage licences to same-sex couples. The couples included prominent New Brunswick gay rights advocate Art Vautour-Toole and his husband Wayne Toole (who had married in Ontario), as well as Catherine Sidney and Bridget McGale, who were denied a licence in Saint John, Wayne Harrison and Ross Leavitt, and James Crooks and Carl Trickey. Their lawyer, Allison Menard, agreed to represent the couples in court free of charge. The case named both the provincial and federal attorneys general as defendants, Brad Green and Irwin Cotler. Menard told The Globe and Mail: "Because Parliament is not doing its job, these couples are being forced to make their challenge in court." A spokesman for Canadians for Equal Marriage confirmed that the couples were "frustrated" with the parliamentary delay in passing the Civil Marriage Act, "It is clear that this court action is a last resort taken by gay and lesbian couples in New Brunswick who want to join the other nearly 90 percent of Canadians who live in jurisdictions where same-sex couples have the right to marry, They don't have that right in New Brunswick, even though they are Canadian citizens, taxpayers and contributing members of their community."

On June 23 of that year, Judge Judy Clendenning of the Court of Queen's Bench of New Brunswick in Moncton ruled that the province's failure to issue marriage licences to same-sex couples was a violation of their Charter rights, in accordance with court rulings in other provinces. She allowed a ten-day grace period to the government to make the necessary administrative adjustments, after which it had to begin issuing same-sex marriage licences. This was less than a month before the Parliament of Canada made same-sex marriage legal throughout the country. The new licences became available on July 4. This decision meant that about 90% of the Canadian population were living in provinces and territories where same-sex marriage is legal. The federal Civil Marriage Act which received royal assent on July 20, 2005 expanded this number to cover the entire country.

Provincial legislation
In March 2007, the Legislative Assembly of New Brunswick amended the provincial Family Services Act to allow same-sex couples to adopt. The amendments took effect on 1 February 2008. In December 2008, the Assembly made numerous amendments to the Marriage Act and other acts regarding family law, replacing references to "husband and wife" with the gender-neutral term "spouses". The legislation received royal assent by Lieutenant Governor Herménégilde Chiasson on 19 December 2008.

New Brunswick legislation recognises cohabitation agreements which can be entered into by two people who live together but are not married to each other. It is a written agreement recognised by the provincial Family Services Act that sets out rights and responsibilities for common-law partners. The agreement provides partners with several, but not all, of the rights and benefits of marriage. Common-law partners are allowed to make medical decisions for each other in the case one partner is unable to (e.g. accident), enjoy the same tax benefits as married spouses, are required to support one another, and may be entitled to share pension credits if the partners have lived together continuously for two years. However, common-law partners lack some of the rights and benefits afforded to married couples, namely that they do not enjoy the same property and inheritance rights as married spouses upon the breakdown of the relationship or the death of the partner. Goods that were purposely intended and acquired for common use by the couple will generally be divided upon separation, but goods acquired by one partner only will generally not be divided and only the partner that purchased the goods will be entitled to them. This is not the case for married couples, as the Marital Property Act provides an equal division of marital property to married spouses. Common-law partners are also not recognised as an heir upon the death of the partner and may not inherit the partner's property, unless explicitly mentioned in a will. However, the Provision for Dependants Act allows a surviving common-law partner to ask a court to order the deceased partner's estate to provide support based on a "dependant" status if the deceased partner did not provide for the surviving partner through a will.

Marriage statistics
The 2016 Canadian census showed that there were 1,435 same-sex couples living in New Brunswick.

Religious performance
Bishop David Edwards of the Diocese of Fredericton voted against a motion to authorise same-sex marriage in the Anglican Church of Canada in July 2019. The motion to permit same-sex marriage was narrowed rejected, and instead the church synod passed a resolution known as "A Word to the Church", allowing its dioceses to choose whether to perform same-sex marriages. Edwards supported the resolution, later saying that "during the Fall, discussions will take place in dioceses across the country, including ours, as to how to respond to the outcome of General Synod".

The Unitarian Fellowship of Fredericton, a congregation of the Canadian Unitarian Council, has been performing same-sex marriage ceremonies since the 1960s.

Public opinion
A 2017 CROP poll showed that 78% of respondents in Atlantic Canada supported same-sex marriage, but did not give a figure for each Atlantic province individually. Nationwide, 74% of Canadians were of the same view, while 26% disagreed.

See also
Same-sex marriage in Canada
LGBT rights in Canada

References

External links

Harrison v. AG of Canada, 2005 NBQB 232

New Brunswick
Politics of New Brunswick
New Brunswick law
2005 in LGBT history